Rhyzodiastes singularis is a species of ground beetle in the subfamily Rhysodinae. It was described by Karl Borromaeus Maria Josef Heller in 1898. It is found on Sulawesi (Indonesia).

References

Rhyzodiastes
Beetles of Indonesia
Endemic fauna of Indonesia
Fauna of Sulawesi
Beetles described in 1898
Taxa named by Karl Borromaeus Maria Josef Heller